Sergio Arturo Castellanos Perdomo (born 21 December 1969 in Concepción del Sur, Santa Bárbara) is a Honduran politician. He served as deputy of the National Congress of Honduras representing the Democratic Unification Party for Santa Bárbara.

References

1969 births
Living people
People from Santa Bárbara Department, Honduras
Democratic Unification Party politicians
Deputies of the National Congress of Honduras